Pinhey is a surname. Notable people with the surname include: 

 Don Pinhey (1930–2014), Canadian football player
 Elliot Pinhey (1910–1999), entomologist
 Hamnett Kirkes Pinhey (1784–1857), Canadian landowner and politician
 Hamnett Pinhey Hill (1877–1942), Ontario lawyer and political figure
 Hugh Theodore Pinhey (1858–1953), British soldier and one of the last surviving veterans of the Second Anglo-Afghan War